Róbert Jován (born 11 April 1967) is a retired Hungarian football striker.

References

1967 births
Living people
Hungarian footballers
MTK Budapest FC players
Fehérvár FC players
Vasas SC players
R. Charleroi S.C. players
FinnPa players
Association football forwards
Hungarian expatriate footballers
Expatriate footballers in Germany
Hungarian expatriate sportspeople in Germany
Expatriate footballers in Belgium
Hungarian expatriate sportspeople in Belgium
Expatriate footballers in Finland
Hungarian expatriate sportspeople in Finland
Belgian Pro League players
2. Bundesliga players
Hungary international footballers
People from Hatvan
Sportspeople from Heves County